Milivoje is a masculine given name. Notable people with the name include:

Milivoje Blaznavac (1824–1873), Serbian soldier and politician
Milivoje Božović (born 1985), Serbian professional basketball player
Milivoje Mićo Božović (born 1957), Montenegrin composer
Milivoje Ćirković (born 1977), Serbian former professional footballer
Milivoje Kostic (born 1952), Serbian-American thermodynamicist, professor emeritus at Northern Illinois University
Milivoje Lazić (born 1978), Slovenian-born Serbian professional basketball coach
Milivoje Mijović (born 1991), Serbian basketball player
Milivoje Novaković (born 1979), former Slovenian footballer
Milivoje Stojanović (1973–1914), Serbian military commander
Milivoje Tomić (1920–2000), Serbian actor
Milivoje Trbić, Yugoslav army captain (kapetan) and member of the Chetniks during World War II
Milivoje Vitakić (born 1977), Serbian former professional footballer
Milivoje Živanović (1900–1976), renowned Serbian film and stage actor

See also
 Milivoj
 Milivojce
 Milivojevci
 Milivojević

Serbian masculine given names